Joot is a 2003 Indian Tamil-language masala film directed by Azhagam Perumal, starring Srikanth and Meera Jasmine with Vivek, FEFSI Vijayan and Murali in supporting roles loosely based on Hindi super hit Ghatak. The music is by Vidyasagar. The film released on 19 December 2003.

Plot

From a small rural village, Eashwaran goes to the bigger city of Chennai with his father, seeking medicine to treat an illness. While in town, they live at the home of Eashwaran's brother, who is caught up in a dangerous web of corruption involving a thug Aditya. As Aditya continues to head dirty deals with local officials, Eashwaran is in over his head and may need his brother's help.

Cast

 Srikanth as Eashwaran
 Meera Jasmine as Meera
 Vivek as Siva
 Murali as Eashwaran's father
 Shyam Ganesh as Ganeshan, Eashwaran's brother
 Lavanya as Megala, Eashwaran's sister-in-law 
 FEFSI Vijayan as Aditya
 Suvarna Mathew as Gayathri
 Tejashree
 Brahmaji as a police officer
 Kovai Senthil as a doctor
 Robo Shankar as Aditya's henchman (uncredited role)

Soundtrack

Music is composed by Vidyasagar.

Critical reception
Sify wrote, "The story of Joot is as stale as yesterday's bread, as the plot is clichéd and seen in umpteen mass films in the same genre. The first half when the hero comes to the city from a village and gets into a fight with local goons for no fault of his, reminds you of Dhool."  Visual Dasan of Kalki wrote that for masala films which are known for entertaining audiences, story has always been secondary. This film was no exception. The director's talent for asking what is next shines through in both visual settings and screenplay.

References

External links 
 

2004 films
2000s Tamil-language films
2000s masala films
Films scored by Vidyasagar